The new mixed dialects is a group of koiné dialects of Polish language, formed in the process of dialect levelling, that are nearly identical to the literary form of Standard Polish. They are present in Western and Northern Poland, mostly within the borders of voivodeships of West Pomerania, Lubusz, Lower Silesia, Pomerania, and the northern part of Warmian-Masurian Voivodeship, within the area historically described as Western Borderlands, but is also present in other areas.

History 
The dialects were formed after 1945, when, in the aftermath of World War II, the German-speaking population of the area later described as the Western Borderlands of Poland has been displaced and replaced with a Polish-speaking one. Due to the differences in various dialects of newly introduced population, the locally spoken language had undergone the process of dialect levelling, becoming nearly indistinguishable from the literary form of the Standard Polish. The area that underwent that process include the Western and Northern parts of Poland, including modern voivodeships of West Pomerania, Lubusz, Lower Silesia, Pomerania, and northern part of Warmian-Masurian Voivodeship. They are also present in other areas, where they co-exist with other dialects.

Dialects 
According to linguist and academic, Stanisław Urbańczyk, the new mixed dialects include 3 dialects, that are:
 Southern, with the domination of the influences from Lesser Poland dialect,
 Northwestern, with the domination of the influences from Greater Poland and Southern Borderlands dialects,
 Northern, with the domination of the influences from the Masovian and Northern Borderlands dialects.

Citations

References

Bibliography 
Stanisław Urbańczyk: Zarys dialektologii polskiej. Warsaw: Państwowe Wydawnictwo Naukowe, 1976.

Polish dialects
Pidgins and creoles